Martin Henig (born 22 March 1942) is a British archaeologist, ethicist, and Anglican clergyman. He is a senior member of Wolfson College, Oxford.

Early life and education
He was born on 22 March 1942 at Harrow, Middlesex. He was educated at Merchant Taylors' School, Northwood, St Catharine's College, Cambridge, the UCL Institute of Archaeology, and Worcester College, Oxford.

Archaeological career
His main field of interest is Roman art, especially engraved gems; he has also published widely on Roman religion, Roman Britain, and Roman sculpture. From 1985 to 2007 he was editor of the Journal of the British Archaeological Association.

Academic recognition
His contributions were honoured in 1998 by Oxford University, which awarded him the higher degree of Doctor of Letters. In 2007 he was presented with a Festschrift. He is a Fellow of the Society of Antiquaries of London.

Church and ethics activities
Having trained at St Stephen's House, Oxford, Henig was ordained in the Church of England as a deacon in 2010 and as a priest in 2011. From 2010 to 2018, he was a non-stipendiary minister at St Frideswide's Church, Osney in the Diocese of Oxford. He has held permission to officiate in the Diocese of Oxford since 2018.

He is a member of the Lesbian and Gay Christian Movement. He was a founder member of Voice for Ethical Research in Oxford, a Fellow of the Oxford Centre for Animal Ethics, and is vice-president of the Anglican Society for the Welfare of Animals.

References

External links

List of Professor Martin Henig's publications

Living people
English archaeologists
1942 births
Alumni of the UCL Institute of Archaeology
People educated at Merchant Taylors' School, Northwood
Alumni of St Catharine's College, Cambridge
Alumni of Worcester College, Oxford
Fellows of Wolfson College, Oxford
21st-century Anglican deacons
Alumni of St Stephen's House, Oxford